Þóra Kristín Jónsdóttir (born 30 March 1997) is an Icelandic basketball player who plays the point guard position for AKS Falcon in the Danish Kvindebasketligaen and the Icelandic national basketball team. She won the Icelandic championship with Haukar in 2018 while also being named to the Úrvalsdeild Domestic All-First Team and finishing third in the selection of the Icelandic Women's Basketball Player of the Year. In 2022, she won the Danish championship and the Danish Cup with AKS Falcon.

Career
Þóra came up through the junior programs of Haukar and played her first senior game in 2012. On 22 February 2014 she won the Icelandic Basketball Cup after Haukar defeated Snæfell in the Cup finals. On 3 October 2015, she helped Haukar win the Icelandic Company Cup, defeating Keflavík in the final.

In 2016, she was loaned to Skallagrímur where she went on to win 1. deild kvenna. In 9 regular season and playoffs games for Skallagrímur, Þóra averaged 8.3 points and 3.9 rebounds per game.

On 30 April 2018, Þóra won the national championship after Haukar defeated Valur 3–2 in Úrvalsdeild finals. She was instrumental to Haukar's victory in game 3 of the series, scoring 22 points and shooting 4 of 7 from three-point range.

On 28 November 2018, Þóra posted a triple-double with 23 points, 11 rebounds and 11 assists in a victory against Breiðablik.

In December 2018, she finished third in the selection of the Icelandic Women's Basketball Player of the Year, behind Helena Sverrisdóttir and winner Hildur Björg Kjartansdóttir.

On 17 December 2018, she went down with an injury in a game against Grindavík in the Icelandic Basketball Cup which was initially feared to be a ruptured achilles tendon. Later tests revealed that the tendon had not ruptured. She returned to action on 6 January 2019, posting a triple-double of 13 points, 11 assists and 11 rebounds in a victory against Skallagrímur. Þóra Kristín averaged 13.1 points, 6.2 rebounds and 5.9 assists during 2018–19 season and was named to the Úrvalsdeild Domestic All-First Team for the second straight year.

During the 2020-21 season, Þóra averaged 9.3 points and 4.9 assists per game and was once again named to the Úrvalsdeild Domestic All-First Team.

Þóra signed with AKS Falcon of the Kvindebasketligaen prior to the 2021-2022 season. In a victory against Åbyhøj, Þóra scored 14 points during a 4 minute span. In March 2022, she won the Danish Cup with the Falcon.  In 2022, she won the Danish championship after Falcon sweeped SISU in the Dameligaen finals.

Icelandic national team
Þóra was first selected to the Icelandic national basketball team in 2017 and was selected for its games in the EuroBasket Women 2019 qualification.

Awards, titles and accomplishments

Individual awards
Úrvalsdeild Domestic All-First Team: 2018, 2019, 2021

Titles
Icelandic champion: 2018
Icelandic Cup: 2014
Dameligaen champion: 2022
Danish Cup: 2022
Icelandic Company Cup: 2015
1. deild kvenna: 2016

References

External links
Icelandic statistics at kki.is
EuroBasket 2019 profile

1997 births
Living people
Thora Kristin Jonsdottir
Thora Kristin Jonsdottir
Thora Kristin Jonsdottir
Thora Kristin Jonsdottir
Point guards